The 11th Cook Islands Parliament was a term of the Parliament of the Cook Islands.  Its composition was determined by the 2004 election, held on 7 September 2004.

Due to a large number of electoral petitions, Parliament did not meet until mid-December 2006.

The Speaker of the 11th Parliament was Norman George.

Members

Initial MPs

References

External links
 Former Members of the Cook Islands Parliament

Politics of the Cook Islands
2004 in the Cook Islands
2005 in the Cook Islands
2006 in the Cook Islands